Sébastien Bézy (born 22 November 1991) is a French rugby union player. His position is scrum-half and he currently plays for Clermont in the Top 14. He is the younger brother of fellow half-back Nicolas Bézy, who currently plays for Provence Rugby.

References

External links
Ligue Nationale De Rugby Profile
European Professional Club Rugby Profile
Stade Toulousain Profile

1991 births
French rugby union players
Living people
France international rugby union players
Stade Toulousain players
ASM Clermont Auvergne players
Rugby union scrum-halves